The Senior women's race at the 2019 IAAF World Cross Country Championships was held at the Aarhus in Denmark, on March 30, 2019. Hellen Obiri from Kenya won the gold medal by two seconds over Ethiopians Dera Dida and Letesenbet Gidey.

Race results

Senior women's race (10 km)

Individual

References

Senior women's race at the World Athletics Cross Country Championships
2019 IAAF World Cross Country Championships